Atlantique may refer to:

 Atlantique (film), a 2019 film
 Atlantique Department in Benin
 SNCF's  TGV Atlantique class of high-speed trains
 The Breguet Atlantique airplane
 Chantiers de l'Atlantique, Saint-Nazaire-based shipyard
 The Venturi Automobiles'  Atlantique sports car
 The SS L'Atlantique was an ocean liner which was a total loss after catching fire at sea

See also

 
 Atlantik (disambiguation)
 Atlantic (disambiguation)